HACR can refer to:
 Heating Air-Conditioning & Refrigeration
 Hidro Antonio Cañete de Reconocimiento, a Spanish flying boat also known as Cañete Pirata
 Hispanic association on corporate responsibility, a nonprofit coalition of Hispanic organizations